Andringitra National Park is a national park in the Haute Matsiatra region of Madagascar,  south of Ambalavao. The park was established in 1999 and is managed by the Madagascar National Parks Association. It was inscribed in the World Heritage Site in 2007 as part of the Rainforests of the Atsinanana.

History
The importance of the area was noted by explorers in the early 20th century and in 1927 the central part of the mountain range was declared a ″Strict Nature Reserve″. During the early 1990s the Malagasy Environmental Action Plan introduced the idea of Madagascar taking ownership of the environmental agenda, rather than donors, and in 1999 the area became a National Park. In 2007 the park became part of the Rainforests of the Atsinanana World Heritage Site.

Geography
The reserve covers  covering much of the granite massif of the Andringitra mountains which rise above plains. Madagascar's lowest temperature,  has been recorded here. The Ampanasana, Iantara, Menarahaka and Zomandao rivers run through the reserve.

Three different groups of people live within the park. In the south and west the Bara people graze cattle on the savannah and in the valleys and on the ridges, while in the east the Bara Haronga grow rice, and the Betsileo people have developed an irrigation system on the mountain flanks of the north for rice cultivation.

Flora and fauna
The park is one of the most biologically diverse places in Madagascar, with many endemic species. The eastern flank of the massif is covered with humid forest, and humid grassland and scrub in the higher areas. On the western flank there is relatively dry forest. There are over one thousand species of plants, one hundred species of birds, and fifty-five species of frogs are known to inhabit the park.

There are over fifty species of mammals, including thirteen species of lemur. Andringitra's ring-tailed lemur population has notably thicker fur than the rest of the island's population. This is likely an adaptation to the colder climate at high altitudes.

See also

 List of national parks of Madagascar

References

External links
 Official Website
 A tent camp close to the entrance of Andringitra park
 Photos within and around Andrigitra park
 Details from FAO Corporate Document Repository

Ihorombe
1999 establishments in Madagascar
National parks of Madagascar
Protected areas established in 1999
Madagascar subhumid forests
Important Bird Areas of Madagascar